Erifasi Otema Allimadi (11 February 1929 – 5 August 2001) was a Ugandan politician who served as the country's  Foreign Minister (1979–1980) in the UNLF government and later on as the country's third Prime Minister of Uganda (1980–1985) in the UPC government.

After the ousting of the regime, he fled the country before returning to Uganda.

Biography 

In the government of President Godfrey Binaisa from June 20, 1979, to May 11, 1980, he was Minister of Foreign Affairs. After Paulo Muwanga's transitional governments and a three-member presidential commission, he was then appointed prime minister by newly elected President Milton Obote on December 18, 1980. He retained that office until the fall of Obote by Lieutenant General Bazilio Olara Okello on July 27, 1985.

Allimadi had 17 children.  His daughter Barbara was an activist associated with the Alliance for National Transformation.

References

1929 births
2001 deaths
Prime Ministers of Uganda
Foreign Ministers of Uganda